= George Mason University President's Park =

University housing area in Fairfax, Virginia

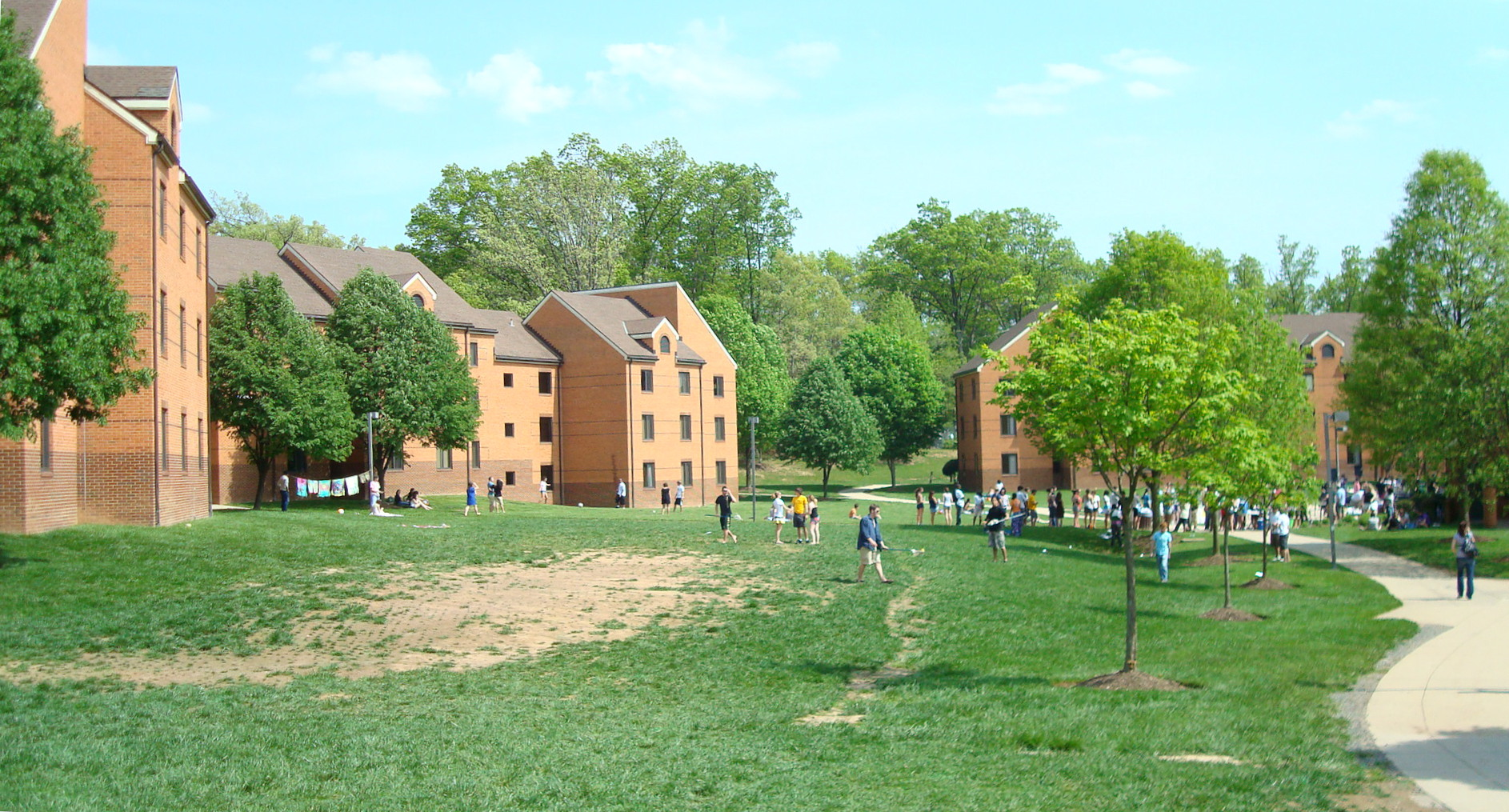
President's Park in late spring 2008

President's Park (commonly known around campus as "The Park") is the largest housing area on the George Mason University, Fairfax, Virginia, campus. It is specifically designated for freshman. It is located on the University's Fairfax Campus on Patriot Circle between the Aquatic Center and Shenandoah River Lane. The thirteen buildings (twelve residential which house around 1,200 students) were opened in 1989. A $3.3M renovation project updated President's Park during the summers of 2008 and 2009.

The 1st-year students live in one, two, three, and four person rooms varying in size. Unlike many universities and freshman housing, all buildings of the park not only include central heating, but central air conditioning as well. There are also free laundry facilities in the lobbies of the Lincoln, Adams, and Harrison buildings.

== Buildings ==
All of the buildings are named after past U.S. Presidents:

- Adams
- Eisenhower (a non residential building located in the center of the park. Includes Ike's Diner, multi-media room, vending areas, numerous study lounges, a 24-hour area desk, and a TV lounge.)
- Harrison
- Jackson
- Jefferson
- Kennedy
- Lincoln
- Madison
- Monroe (contains Pre-Nursing and Global Patriots LLC's)
- Roosevelt
- Truman
- Taylor (contains Arts and VSE LLC's)
- Washington
- Wilson
